Oleg Viktorovich Ivanov (born 29 July 1967) is a retired Russian professional footballer.

Club career
He made his professional debut in the Soviet Second League in 1988 for FC Krasnaya Presnya Moscow. He played 2 seasons in the Soviet Top League for FC Spartak Moscow.

Honours
 Soviet Top League runner-up: 1991.
 Soviet Cup winner: 1992.
 Veikkausliiga champion: 1995, 1998, 1999, 2000.
 Finnish Cup winner: 1997.

European club competitions
 European Cup 1990–91 with FC Spartak Moscow: 4 games, 1 goal.
 UEFA Cup 1991–92 with FC Spartak Moscow: 2 games.
 UEFA Champions League 2001–02 with FC Haka: 2 games in the 3rd qualification round.

References

1967 births
People from Khimki
Living people
Soviet footballers
Russian footballers
FC Asmaral Moscow players
FC Spartak Moscow players
FC Haka players
FC Lahti players
FC Hämeenlinna players
Veikkausliiga players
Russian expatriate footballers
Expatriate footballers in Finland
Expatriate men's footballers in Denmark
Ikast FS players
FC Ilves players
Kotkan Työväen Palloilijat players
Soviet Top League players
Association football midfielders
Russian expatriate sportspeople in Finland
Russian expatriate sportspeople in Denmark
Sportspeople from Moscow Oblast